The following television stations operate on virtual channel 10 in Canada:

 CFEM-DT-1 in Val d'Or, Quebec
 CFPL-DT in London, Ontario
 CFTM-DT in Montreal, Quebec
 CHAU-DT-3 in Port-Daniel-Gascons, Quebec
 CHKL-DT-1 in Penticton, British Columbia
 CITV-DT-1 in Red Deer, Alberta
 CKVU-DT in Vancouver, British Columbia

10 virtual TV stations in Canada